Cleo Coyle is the pen name for American mystery writers Alice Alfonsi in collaboration with her husband Marc Cerasini, best-known for the Coffeehouse Mysteries (Berkley Prime Crime), a series of cozy mysteries set in and around a fictional coffeehouse in the Greenwich Village neighborhood of New York City.

Biography
Alice Alfonsi and Marc Cerasini both grew up with Italian parents in working-class neighborhoods of Pittsburgh, Pennsylvania. Alfonsi graduated from Carnegie Mellon University in Pittsburgh, Pennsylvania;  Cerasini graduated from Ohio University in Athens, Ohio. In New York, Alfonsi worked as a journalist and book author;  Cerasini as a magazine editor, literary critic and fiction and nonfiction author. The couple met in Manhattan and married at the Little Church of the West in Las Vegas. They live in New York City.

Alfonsi was the ghostwriter for Hidden Passions, a novelization of the NBC soap opera Passions, which spent seven weeks on the 2001 New York Times hardcover fiction bestsellers list. Cerasini has written four novels in the 24: Declassified series of original Jack Bauer adventures based on the Fox TV  series 24. He also wrote two  original novels for Marvel Comics featuring Wolverine. His nonfiction includes The Future of War: The Face of 21st Century Warfare (Alpha Books, 2003).

Among their co-authored projects are the Haunted Bookshop mysteries (Penguin Group), originally written under the pen name Alice Kimberly and later published under their Cleo Coyle name. The  paranormal cozy mystery series is set in and around an independent bookstore in Rhode Island, and features the ghost of a hardboiled PI from the 1940s who helps the modern-day bookshop owner solve crimes.

Novels

The Coffeehouse Mystery Series
On What Grounds (2003)
Through the Grinder (2004)
Latte Trouble (2005)
Murder Most Frothy (2006)
Decaffeinated Corpse (2007)
French Pressed (2008)
Espresso Shot (2008)
Holiday Grind (2009)
Roast Mortem (2010)
Murder by Mocha (2011)
A Brew to a Kill (August 2012)
Holiday Buzz (November 2012)
Billionaire Blend (December, 2013)
Once Upon a Grind (December, 2014)
Dead to the Last Drop (December, 2015)
Dead Cold Brew (January, 2017) 
Shot In the Dark (April, 2018)
Brewed Awakening (December 2019)
Honey Roasted (January 2022)

The Haunted Bookshop Mystery Series
The Ghost and Mrs. McClure
The Ghost and the Dead Deb
The Ghost and the Dead Man's Library
The Ghost and the Femme Fatale
The Ghost and the Haunted Mansion
The Ghost and the Bogus Bestseller
The Ghost and the Haunted Portrait
The Ghost and the Stolen Tears
The Ghost Goes to the Dogs

Citations

External links 

Official website
Gumshoe Review interview with Alice Alfonsi
HarperCollins bio

21st-century American novelists
Writers from Pittsburgh
American mystery writers
American women novelists
Women mystery writers
21st-century American women writers
Novelists from Pennsylvania